The 4th Army Brigade is a mixed (mechanized infantry and armoured) brigade of the Serbian Army.

History 
The brigade was formed on 30 June 2007 from the former Army units located in southern Serbia: the 78th Motorized Brigade and parts of the 549th Motorized Brigade and the 52nd Mixed Artillery Brigade.

Structure
Brigade is concentrated in southern Serbia, mainly in Pčinja. Most units are based in Vranje, including the command of the brigade, while other units are based in Bujanovac and Leskovac. It consists of mechanized infantry, armoured, artillery, air defence artillery, engineer, signal and logistics units.

40th Command Battalion - Vranje
41st Infantry Battalion - Bujanovac (Army Base "Jug")
42nd Infantry Battalion - Bujanovac (Army Base "Jug")
43rd Self-Propelled Howitzer Artillery Battalion - Vranje
44th Self-Propelled Multiple Rocket Launcher Artillery Battalion - Leskovac
45th Air-defence Artillery Battalion - Vranje
46th Tank Battalion - Vranje
47th Mechanized Battalion - Vranje
48th Mechanized Battalion - Bujanovac (Army Base "Jug")
49th Logistics Battalion - Vranje
410th Engineer Battalion - Vranje

Equipment
M-84 main battle tank
BVP M-80 infantry fighting vehicle
Lazar armoured personnel carrier 
BRDM-2 armoured reconnaissance vehicle
2S1 Gvozdika 122mm self-propelled howitzer
M-77 Oganj 128mm self-propelled multiple rocket launcher
Strela 1 short-range surface-to-air missile system
Bofors L/70 anti-aircraft gun
engineer and logistic vehicles and equipment

Traditions

Heritage
The 4th Army Brigade continues traditions of the 1st Infantry Regiment "Prince Miloš the Great". The 1st Infantry Regiment "Prince Miloš the Great" was formed in 1897 and has existed until 1941 i.e. after the German attack on Yugoslavia and country's subsequent defeat. Regiment fought in five wars: First Balkan War, Second Balkan War, World War I, the Allied Intervention in Russian Civil War and World War II.

Anniversary
The day of the brigade is celebrated on January 31. On that day in 1878, Vranje was liberated from Ottoman occupation, and on that date in 1897 the 1st Infantry Regiment "Prince Miloš the Great" was formed.

Patron saint
The unit's slava or its patron saint is Saint Athanasius.

References

External links

4th Land Force Brigade Web Page

Brigades of Serbia
Military units and formations established in 2007